This is a list of Broadway shows with 1,000 or more performances, sorted by number of performances. Nine shows currently running on Broadway have at least 1,000 performances: The Phantom of the Opera, the 1996 revival of Chicago, The Lion King, Wicked, The Book of Mormon, Aladdin, Hamilton, Harry Potter and the Cursed Child, and Hadestown.

List
Unless otherwise noted, the run count listed is for the original Broadway production of the show.  M denotes a musical, P denotes a straight play, R denotes revue, D denotes a dance show, and S denotes a special show or event. Totals current through March 19, 2023.

Timeline of longest-running Broadway shows 

This is a list of shows that have held the record for being the longest-running show (including straight plays and musicals) on Broadway since 1853.  A few probable longest-running plays prior to 1853 are also listed.

Not included below is the 1976 revival of the revue Oh! Calcutta!, which briefly overtook A Chorus Line as the Broadway show which had played the most performances, even though A Chorus Line had opened more than a year earlier and was still playing. Oh! Calcutta! achieved this distinction by playing more than the standard eight performances per week. A Chorus Line retook the record for most performances after Oh! Calcutta! closed.

The longest running off-Broadway musical to date is The Fantasticks, which starred Jerry Orbach. When it closed on January 13, 2002, it had run for 42 years and 17,162 performances, making it the world's longest-running musical. The current longest-running musical on Broadway is The Phantom of the Opera, which opened in 1988 and played its 10,000th performance in 2012.

M denotes a musical and P denotes a straight play.

See also
Long-running musical theatre productions
List of the longest-running West End shows
List of the shortest-running Broadway shows

References
Notes

External links
Playbill article, "Long Runs on Broadway"
Internet Broadway Database
List of plays that have achieved runs of over 400 performances on Broadway, Off-Broadway, London, Toronto, Melbourne, Paris, Vienna, and Berlin

Further reading 

 Laufe, Abe. Anatomy of a Hit: Long-Run Plays on Broadway from 1900 to the Present Day. New York: Hawthorn Books, 1966.
 Schildcrout, Jordan. In the Long Run: A Cultural History of Broadway's Hit Plays. New York and London: Routledge, 2019.
 Sheward, David. It's a Hit!: The Back Stage Book of Longest-Running Broadway Shows, 1884 to the Present. New York: Back Stage Books, 1994

Broadway theatre
Longest-running Broadway shows
Longest running Broadway